The "Parvularculaceae" are a family of marine bacteria.

References

Alphaproteobacteria